The Houston Mayoral Election of 1987 took place on November 3, 1987. Incumbent Mayor Kathy Whitmire was re-elected to a fourth term.

Candidates
Incumbent Mayor Kathy Whitmire
Bill Anderson
Dick Dimond
Glenn Arnett
Mary Pritchard
Shelby Oringderff
Don Geil

Results

Mayoral election
Houston mayoral election
Houston
Houston mayoral election
1987
Non-partisan elections